Marmorana is a genus of air-breathing land snails, terrestrial pulmonate gastropod mollusks in the family Helicidae.

Distribution 
Italy

Species 
Species within the genus Tyrrheniberus include:
 Tyrrheniberus ridens (Martens, 1884)
 Tyrrheniberus sardonius (Martens, 1884) – type species
 Tyrrheniberus villicus (Paulucci, 1882)

References

Further reading 
 Fiorentino V., Salomone N., Manganelli G. & Giusti F. (2010). "Historical biogeography of Tyrrhenian land snails: The Marmorana–Tyrrheniberus radiation (Pulmonata, Helicidae)". Molecular Phylogenetics and Evolution 55(1): 26–37. .

Helicidae
Gastropod genera